Balanak Bonihar O Pallavi (The peasants on the banks of river Balan and Pallavi) is a short story collection, written by Dr Binod Bihari Verma, on the village life of Mithila on the banks of the Kosi River and its tributaries.

Overview
This short story collection has fourteen short stories centering on the village society of Mithila. The focus of the stories and the protagonists are from the middle and lower middle class of the population. It deals with their social interactions, their dreams and aspirations, and their interaction with the predominant forces of their environment namely, the rivers.

Explanation of the Book's title
Balanak Bonihar O Pallavi means the tiller by the river and Pallavi, a common feminine name neing a metaphor for the agricultural produce of the farmer. It is the title of the first short story in this collection and is reflective of the general theme of the stories.

Critical reception
  has the following review:

Characters in "Balanak bonihar o pallavi"
Most of the short stories have certain similar central characters, these are:
 Balan: The "river" or the flood waters
 Sounse: Gangetic river dolphin, Platenista gangetica, which populates kosi and its tributaries, now a species on verge  of extinction
 Oxygen, Hydrogen: Representing the chemicals
 Various human characters having different names although representing similar socioeconomic strata:
 Rannu Sardar
 Sulochana
 Saheb
 Gonour babu
 Real life characters:
 Prof Upendra Thakur
 Prof Radha Krishna Choudhary

Major themes
 Life on the banks of rivers in Mithila
 Environmental pollution
 Lot of the women in Mithila
 Marital relationship in the rural poor
 The annual cycle of flooding and the devastation
 Unemployment
 Curse of the Dowry system in Mithila

Allusions and references
 River: Kosi river
 People:
 Prof Upendra Thakur
 Prof Radha Krishna Choudhary

Stories
 Balanak bonihar o pallavi
 Kunti karna o parshuram
 Sulochnak chatisar
 Saheb
 Brahma - bisun - rati
 Ham pan khelonhh
 Fulak katha
 Antarmukhi vasundhara
 Kasha k ful
 Machhak piknik
 Jivan - nao
 Ka purush
 Gonour babu
 Aakash ful

External links
University of Washington Library entry of Balanak Bonihar O Pallavi

Books on Mithila Region
Maithili-language books
Indian short story collections
1994 short story collections
Culture of Bihar
Culture of Mithila